La Chapelotte is a commune in the Cher department in the Centre-Val de Loire region of France.

Geography

Population

Sights
 The church of Notre-Dame, dating from the twentieth century.
 Two watermills.

See also
Communes of the Cher department

References

Communes of Cher (department)